Haplormosia monophylla, commonly known as Liberian black gum, is a species of legume in the family Fabaceae. It is found in Cameroon, Ivory Coast, Liberia, Nigeria, and Sierra Leone. It is threatened by habitat loss. It is the only member of the genus Haplormosia (though a second species, Haplormosia ledermannii Harms, is unresolved).

References

Faboideae
Flora of West Tropical Africa
Vulnerable plants
Monotypic Fabaceae genera
Taxonomy articles created by Polbot